The 2018 season was the 89th season of competitive baseball in the United Kingdom.

The season began in April and ran until early September.

British Baseball Federation leagues

National Baseball League

London Mets defeated Hertfordshire Falcons in the finals, two games to nil.

Triple-A

Double-A

Central Division

South Division

Pool A

Pool B

Single-A

Central

South

Pool A

Pool B

Table

British Baseball League

The British Baseball League is unaffiliated to the British Baseball Federation.

Northern Baseball League

NBL AAA

Table

NBL AA

Table

NBL A

Table

South West Baseball League

Baseball Scotland

References

Baseball in the United Kingdom
Baseball
Baseball
British
Baseball competitions in the United Kingdom